Stephen N. Adubato Sr. (December 24, 1932 – October 13, 2020) was an American politician and teacher, notable in Newark, New Jersey.

Early life and education 
Stephen N. Adubato Sr. grew up in Newark, New Jersey, one of five siblings. His father died in 1950 at the age of 44.

He graduated from Barringer High School in Newark in 1949 and received his bachelor's degree in political science from Seton Hall University in 1954. Adubato attended Rutgers Law School, but did not complete his degree. He began his career in education as a history and government teacher in the Newark public school system, where he taught for 15 years. While teaching, he obtained a master's degree in education from Seton Hall University in 1960 and completed the coursework for a doctorate in education. Adubato was awarded an honorary doctorate from Kean University on May 11, 2010.

Career 
In 1962, Adubato ran for office as a Democratic District Leader in Newark's North Ward, to which he was elected. In 1968 he was elected as North Ward Democratic party chairman.

Adubato served on the executive board of the Newark Teachers' Union and worked as their legislative representative and he was a consultant to the New Jersey chancellor of higher education.

In 1970, he founded The North Ward Educational and Cultural Center in a small office on the second floor of a storefront on Bloomfield Avenue in Newark. The name was later changed to The North Ward Center. In 1973, The North Ward Center purchased the Clark Mansion, which previously housed the Prospect Country and Day School, a financially troubled private school that could not restore nor maintain the historical integrity of the facility.

In 1997, The North Ward Center founded the Robert Treat Academy Charter School, one of the first charter schools authorized by the New Jersey Department of Education. The school has 675 students in grades K-8. In 2008, Robert Treat was named a Blue Ribbon school by the US Department of Education. In August 2009, Robert Treat opened a second campus in the former St. Mary's school on the campus of the Newark Abbey.

In August 2009, Adubato stepped down as executive director. His daughter, Michele Adubato, is the current CEO. Historian Terry Golway has referred to Adubato as "the legendary boss of Newark’s North Ward."

Personal life 
He married Frances Calvello in 1954. They had three children, including politician Steve Adubato Jr.

Adubato died on October 13, 2020 after a long illness at the age of 87.

References

External links
 New Jersey Monthly 2009

1932 births
2020 deaths
Barringer High School alumni
New Jersey Democrats
Seton Hall University alumni
Rutgers University alumni
Kean University alumni
Politicians from Newark, New Jersey